Forum 18 is a Norwegian human rights organization that promotes religious freedom. The organization's name is based on Article 18 of the Universal Declaration of Human Rights. Forum 18 summarizes the article as:

The right to believe, to worship and witness
The right to change one's belief or religion
The right to join together and express one's belief

The Forum 18 News Service, established by Forum 18 on March 13, 2003, is a web and e-mail initiative to report on threats and actions against the religious freedom of all people, whatever their religious affiliation, in an objective, truthful and timely manner. The first three reporters to lead this project were Felix Corley, Geraldine Fagan, and Igor Rotar. They had previously done similar reporting for the UK-based Keston News Service and continued this work at Forum 18 after Keston Institute closed its news service due to financial difficulties and staff changes. 

The news service mainly concentrates on the states of the former Soviet Union, including Belarus, Georgia, Tajikistan, Turkmenistan, Uzbekistan, Central Asia, and Eastern Europe, but has also published reports on Kosovo, Macedonia, Serbia, Turkey, Burma, China (including Xinjiang), Laos, Mongolia, North Korea, and Vietnam.

The news service is published in two editions: a weekly news summary each Friday; and an almost daily edition published on weekdays. There is a searchable archive of reports, including religious freedom surveys of countries and regions, and personal commentaries on religious freedom issues.

In August 2005 one of the organisation's reporters was detained and deported by the authorities at Tashkent airport in Uzbekistan, but it carries on covering that country.

The reports on religious freedom from Forum 18 News Service are widely used by international organizations like Amnesty International, Human Rights Watch, and the Organization for Security and Co-operation in Europe (OSCE), as well as numerous news sites with different religious affiliation (i.e. Muslim, Christian, Bahá'í, and Buddhist).

Notes

External links

International organisations based in Norway
Human rights organisations based in Norway
Religion and politics
Religious persecution
Christian advocacy groups
Freedom of expression organizations